The hallmarks of aging are the types of biochemical changes that occur in all organisms that experience biological aging and lead to a progressive loss of physiological integrity, impaired function and, eventually, death. They were first listed in a landmark paper in 2013 to conceptualize the essence of biological aging and its underlying mechanisms.

The following three premises for the interconnected hallmarks have been proposed:
 "their age-associated manifestation"
 "the acceleration of aging by experimentally accentuating them"
 "the opportunity to decelerate, stop, or reverse aging by therapeutic interventions on them"

Overview 

Over time, almost all living organisms experience a gradual and irreversible increase in senescence and an associated loss of proper function of the bodily systems. As aging is the primary risk factor for major human diseases, including cancer, diabetes, cardiovascular disorders, and neurodegenerative diseases, it is important to describe and classify the types of changes that it entails.

After a decade, the authors of the heavily cited original paper updated the set of proposed hallmarks in January 2023. In the new paywalled review, three new hallmarks have been added (not included or categorized below): disabled macroautophagy, chronic inflammation and dysbiosis, totaling 12 proposed hallmarks.

The nine hallmarks of aging of the original paper are grouped into three categories as below:

Primary hallmarks (causes of damage)
 Genome instability
 Telomere shortening (or telomere attrition)
 Epigenetic alterations
 Loss of proteostasis

Antagonistic hallmarks (responses to damage)
 Deregulated nutrient sensing
 Mitochondrial dysfunction
 Cellular senescence

Integrative hallmarks (culprits of the phenotype)
 Stem cell exhaustion
 Altered intercellular communication

Primary hallmarks are the primary causes of cellular damage. Antagonistic hallmarks are antagonistic or compensatory responses to the manifestation of the primary hallmarks. Integrative hallmarks are the functional result of the previous two groups of hallmarks that lead to further operational deterioration associated with aging.

There are also proposed further hallmarks or underlying mechanisms that drive multiple of these hallmarks.

The hallmarks 
Each hallmark was chosen to try to fulfill the following criteria:

 manifests during normal aging;
 experimentally increasing it accelerates aging;
 experimentally amending it slows the normal aging process and increases healthy lifespan.

These conditions are met to different extents by each of these hallmarks. The last criterion is not present in many of the hallmarks, as science has not yet found feasible ways to amend these problems in living organisms.

Genome instability 

Proper functioning of the genome is one of the most important prerequisites for the smooth functioning of a cell and the organism as a whole. Alterations in the genetic code have long been considered one of the main causal factors in aging. In multicellular organisms genome instability is central to carcinogenesis, and in humans it is also a factor in some neurodegenerative diseases such as amyotrophic lateral sclerosis or the neuromuscular disease myotonic dystrophy.

Abnormal chemical structures in the DNA are formed mainly through oxidative stress and environmental factors. A number of molecular processes work continuously to repair this damage. Unfortunately, the results are not perfect, and thus damage accumulates over time. Several review articles have shown that deficient DNA repair, allowing greater accumulation of DNA damages, causes premature aging; and that increased DNA repair facilitates greater longevity.

Telomere shortening 

Telomeres are regions of repetitive nucleotide sequences associated with specialized proteins at the ends of linear chromosomes. They protect the terminal regions of chromosomal DNA from progressive degradation and ensure the integrity of linear chromosomes by preventing DNA repair systems from mistaking the ends of the DNA strand for a double strand break.

Telomere shortening is associated with aging, mortality and aging-related diseases. Normal aging is associated with telomere shortening in both humans and mice, and studies on genetically modified animal models suggest causal links between telomere erosion and aging. Leonard Hayflick demonstrated that a normal human fetal cell population will divide between 40 and 60 times in cell culture before entering a senescence phase. Each time a cell undergoes mitosis, the telomeres on the ends of each chromosome shorten slightly. Cell division will cease once telomeres shorten to a critical length. This is useful when uncontrolled cell proliferation (like in cancer) needs to be stopped, but detrimental when normally functioning cells are unable to divide when necessary.

An enzyme called telomerase elongates telomeres in gametes and embryonic stem cells. Telomerase deficiency in humans has been linked to several aging-related diseases related to loss of regenerative capacity of tissues. It has also been shown that premature aging in telomerase-deficient mice is reverted when telomerase is reactivated.

Epigenomic alterations 

Out of all the genes that make up a genome, only a subset are expressed at any given time. The functioning of a genome depends both on the specific order of its nucleotides (genomic factors), and also on which sections of the DNA chain are spooled on histones and thus rendered inaccessible, and which ones are unspooled and available for transcription (epigenomic factors). Depending on the needs of the specific tissue type and environment that a given cell is in, histones can be modified to turn specific genes on or off as needed. The profile of where, when and to what extent these modifications occur (the epigenetic profile) changes with aging, turning useful genes off and unnecessary ones on, disrupting the normal functioning of the cell.

As an example, sirtuins are a type of protein deacetylases that promote the binding of DNA onto histones and thus turn unnecessary genes off. These enzymes use NAD as a cofactor. As we age, the level of NAD in our cells decreases and so does the ability of sirtuins to turn off unneeded genes at the right time. Decreasing the activity of sirtuins has been associated with accelerated aging and increasing their activity has been shown to stave off several age-related diseases.

Loss of proteostasis 

Proteostasis is the homeostatic process of maintaining all the proteins necessary for the functioning of the cell in their proper shape, structure and abundance. Protein misfolding, oxidation, abnormal cleavage or undesired post-translational modification can create dysfunctional or even toxic proteins or protein aggregates that hinder the normal functioning of the cell. Though these proteins are continually removed and recycled, formation of damaged or aggregated proteins increases with age, leading to a gradual loss of proteostasis. This can be slowed or suppressed by caloric restriction or by administration of rapamycin, both through inhibiting the mTOR pathway.

Deregulated nutrient sensing 

Nutrient sensing is a cell's ability to recognize, and respond to, changes in the concentration of macronutrients such as glucose, fatty acids and amino acids. In times of abundance, anabolism is induced through various pathways, the most well-studied among them the mTOR pathway. When energy and nutrients are scarce, the AMPK receptor senses this and switches off mTOR to conserve resources.

In a growing organism, growth and cell proliferation are important and thus mTOR is upregulated. In a fully grown organism, mTOR-activating signals naturally decline during aging. It has been found that forcibly overactivating these pathways in grown mice leads to accelerated aging and increased incidence of cancer. mTOR inhibition methods like dietary restriction or administering rapamycin have been shown to be one of the most robust methods of increasing lifespan in worms, flies and mice.

Mitochondrial dysfunction 

The mitochondrion is the powerhouse of the cell. Different human cells contain from 20 to 30 up to several thousand mitochondria, each one converting carbon (in the form of acetyl-CoA) and oxygen into energy (in the form of ATP) and carbon dioxide. 
During aging, the efficiency of mitochondria tends to decrease. The reasons for this are still quite unclear, but several mechanisms are suspected - reduced biogenesis, accumulation of damage and mutations in mitochondrial DNA, oxidation of mitochondrial proteins, and defective quality control by mitophagy.

Dysfunctional mitochondria contribute to aging through interfering with intracellular signaling and triggering inflammatory reactions.

Cellular senescence 

Under certain conditions, a cell will exit the cell cycle without dying, instead becoming dormant and ceasing its normal function. This is called cellular senescence. Senescence can be induced by several factors, including telomere shortening, DNA damage and stress. Since the immune system is programmed to seek out and eliminate senescent cells, it might be that senescence is one way for the body to rid itself of cells damaged beyond repair.

The links between cell senescence and aging are several:

 The proportion of senescent cells increases with age.
 Senescent cells secrete inflammatory markers which may contribute to aging.
 Clearance of senescent cells has been found to delay the onset of age-related disorders.

Stem cell exhaustion 

Stem cells are undifferentiated or partially differentiated cells that can proliferate indefinitely. For the first few days after fertilization, the embryo consists almost entirely of stem cells. As the fetus grows, the cells multiply, differentiate and assume their appropriate function within the organism. In adults, stem cells are mostly located in areas that undergo gradual wear (intestine, lung, mucosa, skin) or need continuous replenishment (red blood cells, immune cells, sperm cells, hair follicles).

Loss of regenerative ability is one of the most obvious consequences of aging. This is largely because the proportion of stem cells and the speed of their division gradually lowers over time. It has been found that stem cell rejuvenation can reverse some of the effects of aging at the organismal level.

Altered intercellular communication 

Different tissues and the cells they consist of need to orchestrate their work in a tightly controlled manner so that the organism as a whole can function. One of the main ways this is achieved is through excreting signal molecules into the blood where they make their way to other tissues, affecting their behavior. The profile of these molecules changes as we age.

One of the most prominent changes in cell signaling biomarkers is "inflammaging", the development of a chronic low-grade inflammation throughout the body with advanced age. The normal role of inflammation is to recruit the body's immune system and repair mechanisms to a specific damaged area for as long as the damage and threat are present. The constant presence of inflammation markers throughout the body wears out the immune system and damages healthy tissue.

It's also been found that senescent cells excrete a specific set of molecules called the SASP (Senescence-Associated Secretory Phenotype) which induce senescence in neighboring cells. Conversely, lifespan-extending manipulations targeting one tissue can slow the aging process in other tissues as well.

Further hallmarks 

These may constitute further hallmarks or underlying mechanisms that drive multiple of these hallmarks.
 Resurrection of endogenous retroviruses could be "a hallmark and driving force of cellular senescence and tissue aging" as retroviruses in the human genomes can become awakened from dormant states and contribute to aging which can be blocked by neutralizing antibodies.

Alternative conceptual models 

Other scientists have defined a slightly different conceptual model for aging, called 'The Seven Pillars of Aging', in which just three of the 'hallmarks of aging' are included (stem cells and regeneration, proteostasis, epigenetics). The seven pillars model highlights the interconnectedness between all of the seven pillars which is not highlighted in the nine hallmarks of aging model.

Links to other diseases or hallmarks 
Authors of the original paper merged or linked various hallmarks of cancer with those of aging.

The authors also concluded that the hallmarks are not only interconnected among each other but also "to the recently proposed hallmarks of health, which include organizational features of spatial compartmentalization, maintenance of homeostasis, and adequate responses to stress".

See also 

Biomarkers of aging
Senescence#Theories of aging
Ageing#Biological basis

Life extension#Strategies
Negligible senescence
Strategies for engineered negligible senescence
Stem cell theory of aging
Timeline of senescence research

References 

Ageing
Senescence